Conor Gleeson (born 1973 in Boherlahan, County Tipperary) is an Irish hurler. He played for his local club Boherlahan–Dualla and was a member of the Tipperary senior inter-county team from 1995 until 2004.

References

Teams

1973 births
Living people
Boherlahan-Dualla hurlers
Tipperary inter-county hurlers
Munster inter-provincial hurlers
All-Ireland Senior Hurling Championship winners